Springfield School is a historic school building located in Richmond, Virginia.  The Gothic Revival structure was built in 1913 based on a design by noted Virginia architect Charles M. Robinson.  The -story structure has a granite exterior, a raised  basement and a small penthouse.  The building was listed on the National Register of Historic Places in 1992.  Its inclusion on the National Register was based upon the school's association with an important period of development for the Richmond Public School system, its association with Charles M. Robinson, its Gothic Revival architectural style, and the unusual use of granite (rather than brick) as the exterior construction material for a school structure in the area.

References

National Register of Historic Places in Richmond, Virginia
Gothic Revival architecture in Virginia
School buildings completed in 1913
Schools in Richmond, Virginia
School buildings on the National Register of Historic Places in Virginia
1913 establishments in Virginia